Diego Enrique Pizarro Bosio (born 14 August 1990) is a Peruvian professional footballer who plays as a striker or winger. He is the younger brother of striker Claudio Pizarro.

Club career
Diego developed as footballer within Bayern Munich's youth academy. On 31 August 2009, it was announced that he joined Peruvian club Coronel Bolognesi for the last part of the 2009 Descentralizado season. However, he did not manage to play for Bolognesi as
he suffered an injury that kept him from making his debut. At the end of the 2009 season Bolognesi was relegated to the second division.

In January 2010, he signed for Peruvian club Sport Boys Association for the start of the 2010 Descentralizado season. Diego made his professional debut in the Peruvian First Division on 29 May 2010 in an away match against José Gálvez FBC. He entered the match in the 73rd minute replacing Miguel Curiel. That season Diego mainly played for the Sport Boys reserve team and finished as the top goal scorer for his team in the 2010 Torneo de Promoción y Reserva with 9 goals. His last appearance for Sport Boys in the Peruvian First Division was on 17 October 2010 in a 2–1 win at home against Universidad César Vallejo.

On 31 January 2011, it was announced that Diego joined Peruvian club Colegio Nacional de Iquitos for the start of the 2011 Descentralizado season.

References

External links
 
 

1990 births
Living people
Footballers from Lima
Association football forwards
Peruvian footballers
Peruvian expatriate footballers
Expatriate footballers in Germany
Peruvian expatriate sportspeople in Germany
Peruvian Primera División players
Academia Deportiva Cantolao players
Coronel Bolognesi footballers
Sport Boys footballers
Colegio Nacional Iquitos footballers
Cienciano footballers
Unión Comercio footballers
FBC Melgar footballers
Juan Aurich footballers
Comerciantes Unidos footballers